Ian Dunlop (born 1940) is a Scottish writer and former art critic for the Evening Standard.  His first book, The Shock of the New,  about seven historic exhibitions of modern art, was published in 1972.  It was followed by books on Van Gogh, and on the life and art of Edgar Degas (1979).  He has also written books and articles on contemporary American and British art and has contributed reviews and art criticism to The Times,  Studio International, Apollo, The Times Literary Supplement and The Spectator.

Dunlop was born in Edinburgh, the eldest son of Commander Frederick Hamilton Dunlop, R.N. and the grandson of Sir Thomas Charles Dunlop of Doonside (1878–1960), sportsman, printer and publisher of the Ayr Advertiser.  He was educated at Eton College and then Trinity College, Dublin, where he read Mental and Moral Science. He now lives in London. In 2016, he published The Urban Fox, which is his first collection of poems.

Besides writing, Dunlop has worked as an art expert for Sotheby's, New York and was for a time Head of Contemporary Art. He also worked as an art dealer and was a founder member of the Artis Group.

Works 
1965                       The New Generation: 1965 introduction and notes to an exhibition of nine British sculptors at the Whitechapel Gallery, London

1971                       Proust and Painting Proust 1871-1922, a Centennial Volume, edited by Peter Quennel, published by Weidenfeld & Nicolson.

1972                       Cezanne Introduction to the English edition of The Complete Paintings of Cezanne, published by Weidenfeld & Nicolson.

The Shock of the New, published by Weidenfeld & Nicolson.

1973                       Van Gogh, published by Weidenfeld & Nicolson

1977                       Edvard Munch, published by Thames and Hudson

Contributed to a number of journals and art magazines, including: The Dubliner, Apollo, Studio International, Connoisseur, Books and Bookmen and The Spectator, The Times Literary Supplement, The Independent on Sunday and The Times.

1979                       Degas, published by Harper & Row and Phaidon

1987                       Donald Sultan with Lynne Warren, catalogue introduction to an exhibition organised by the Museum of Contemporary Art, Chicago and

Published by Harry N Abrams.

1999                       Golf, by Bernard Darwin. Foreword by Ian Dunlop, reprinted of original 1954 edition by Ailsa Inc.

2001                       Oxford Companion to Western Art, ed. Brigstocke, entry on Exhibitions. Published by Oxford University Press.

2016                       The Urban Fox, published by Paekariki Press, Walthamstow, 2016.

References

External links 

 http://www.spectator.co.uk/author/ian-dunlop/
 http://www.theoldie.co.uk/article/happy-straddling-of-science-and-art
 http://paekakarikipress.com/?content=events.php
 http://www.worldcat.org/title/degas/oclc/907582935&referer=brief_results

Writers from Edinburgh
Living people
Date of birth missing (living people)
People educated at Eton College
1940 births
Art writers
Scottish art critics
Scottish male poets
21st-century Scottish poets
21st-century British male writers
20th-century Scottish writers